Pilar Zeta is an Argentine multimedia artist, graphic designer, and creative director currently residing in the United States. She is best known for her surrealist album covers, mystical-futurism artwork and long-time partnership with British rock band Coldplay, receiving a nomination for Best Recording Package at the 63rd Grammy Awards for their eighth album Everyday Life (2019). She created the Hall of Visions installation at Miami's Art Basel for Faena Art as well.

Early life 
Pilar Zeta was born and raised in Buenos Aires, Argentina. Drawing and painting since the age of six, early on she saw art as a medium of expression. Her father would take her to art museums, where she recollects being "overwhelmed with the colors and techniques", as well as excited to recreate at home what she saw. While young, Zeta was also exposed by her mother to Indigo children philosophies, which made her interested in cosmology, metaphysics, and later on meditation. She was introduced to 1960s rock bands such as Pink Floyd, Led Zeppelin and the Alan Parsons Project by her brother, paying mind to the bands' psychedelic album covers. In her early teens Zeta then became a user of softwares such as Corel Draw and Photoshop, explaining that "once I started going to school, my favourite subject was computers [...] And besides that I've been always an avid lover of books, especially the covers, I would stare at them for hours. I always knew I was going to be an artist."

Career

Early years 
Leaving Argentina at the age of nineteen, Zeta moved to the United States as a foreign exchange student. Within a year she was hired as a graphic designer, despite having no formal secondary training. In Miami she soon began designing artwork for musicians and promoters in the local EDM scene. In 2009 she moved from Miami to Berlin, exhibiting her art there, in London, and in Moscow. Her pieces have since been reviewed in publications such as Groove Magazine, Vogue, Flaunt, L'Officiel, and many others.

Collaboration with Coldplay 
During 2015, Zeta's work was encountered by Phil Harvey, Coldplay's creative director. He commissioned a piece for the band's seventh studio album A Head Full of Dreams, which would be released in December of that year. She collaborated with them on a studio in London to make a three meters handmade collage with childhood images of each member of the band. A kaleidoscope version of it was then used as the album cover, including a colorful version of the flower of life designed by herself in the middle. Zeta would ultimately settle a long-term partnership with them, including the art direction for 2019's Everyday Life, which was nominated for Best Recording Package at the 63rd Grammy Awards, as well as the artwork and package from 2021's Music of the Spheres. Since 2017 she has also worked with other mainstream artists, such as in the visual design for Katy Perry's "Teenage Dream" live performances at Witness: The Tour, the artwork and music video direction for Camila Cabello's "Don't Go Yet", and the package for Lil Nas X's Montero.

Hall of Visions 
In 2021, Zeta was commissioned by Faena Art to do a large scale installation during Miami Art Week at the Faena Hotel. Under the name Hall of Visions, the site-specific artwork features a sculpture named Hatch, which depicts a cracked egg as symbol of rebirth and realization according to Regia Magazine. She described the piece as a tribute to the history of Art Deco and that "it is meant to be a portal for people to connect with their own Vision". Clarín praised the installation for its "triumphal arches" that can be a "callback to a hotel as much as a temple". It was one of the most photographed artworks of the event, being also released as a NFT through a partnership with Aorist.

Style and influences

Artwork 
Zeta's artwork is heavily influenced by her upbringing and an interest in Ancient Egypt, cosmology and metaphysics. While being interviewed for Vogue, she described it as "colorful", "retro-futuristic" and "otherworldly", concluding that "it is like a parallel universe". According to Flaunt, her pieces are characterized by "pastel postmodernist aesthetics" and "could very well be a trip through the cosmos". Zeta employs multiple mediums on her work as well, sometimes drawing and scanning her own art or using photographs from flea markets and old books for collages, creating her own resources from shapes to textures: "I draw them in Illustrator or create them in Cinema 4D and then migrate them to Photoshop".

Music 
When asked about her musical style, Zeta mentioned being shaped by her obsession with postmodern furniture: “I was trying to redecorate my house while we were doing the music. All these lines crossed, and after a while, we just had all the songs for the album, and making the artwork was just so easy because it was part of it". In 2018, she released her debut record Moments of Reality. Produced in collaboration with Jimmy Edgar, it attempts to fulfill her desire of fitting art, music, and clothing seamlessly together, being inspired on Japanese musician Haruomi Hosono and synth group Art of Noise.

Discography
 Moments of Reality (2018)

Design credits

Further reading 
Interviews

See also
List of graphic designers
List of Argentine Grammy Award winners and nominees

References

External links
Pilar Zeta at AllMusic
Pilar Zeta at Discogs
Pilar Zeta on Facebook
Pilar Zeta on Instagram

Living people
People from Buenos Aires
Argentine graphic designers
Women graphic designers
Argentine fashion designers
Argentine women fashion designers
Album-cover and concert-poster artists
Year of birth missing (living people)